Church of San Esteban may refer to:
 Church of San Esteban (Ábalos)
 Church of San Esteban (Ciaño)
 Church of San Esteban (Fresno del Torote)
 Church of San Esteban (Murillo de Río Leza)
 Church of San Esteban (Segovia)

See also 
 Church of San Esteban de Aramil, a church in Asturias, Spain